Nicolas Giraud (born 12 November 1978) is a French actor and filmmaker. Among the various films roles in which he has appeared in, he was one of the kidnappers in the 2008 film Taken. He is the writer, director and editor of the short film Faiblesses (2009).

Selected filmography

External links
 
 Filmography at fandango.com
 Salomé Stévenin : comme une étoile dans la nuit  Play review in French

1978 births
Living people
People from Saintes, Charente-Maritime
French male film actors
French male television actors
French male stage actors
21st-century French male actors
French film directors
French male screenwriters
French screenwriters
French film editors
French male non-fiction writers